Glorious is the title of English comedian Eddie Izzard's 1997 performance at the Hammersmith Apollo. The performance was released on VHS and covers topics such as the siege of Troy, Noah's Ark, the Royal Family, and the birth of baby Jesus. In many ways, the flow of topics follow from the Bible, starting with the beginning of time according to the Old Testament and ending with Armageddon according to the Book of Revelation, though they are covered in Izzard's usual surreal style.

External links
Glorious - article at The Official Eddie Izzard Site

The Cake or Death Site

Eddie Izzard albums
Stand-up comedy albums
Spoken word albums by English artists
Stand-up comedy concert films
1997 live albums
1997 video albums
Live video albums
1990s comedy albums